Oğrubulaq (also, Ogrubulak and Ogru-Bulakh) is a village and municipality in the Jalilabad Rayon of Azerbaijan.  It has a population of 235.

References 

Populated places in Jalilabad District (Azerbaijan)